This is a list of people with the surname, Warrington.

A 

 Andrew Clifford Warrington (born 10 June 1976) English professional footballer
 Alfred C. Warrington, (born 1935) American accountant and business executive
 Alicia Warrington (born August 30, 1980), American drummer and ring announcer

B 

 Bill Warrington (1910-1981), American special effects artist
 Bill Warrington, character in All Creatures Great and Small
 Brenda Warrington, British Labour politician and former leader of Tameside Metropolitan Borough Council

C 

 Charles Warrington (born May 28, 1971), American professional wrestler

D 

 Don Warrington, Trinidadian-born British actor
 Don Warrington (Canadian Football), (June 7, 1948 – December 4, 1980), Canadian football player

E 

 Elizabeth Kerr Warrington FRS (born 1931), British neurologist

F 

 Freda Warrington, British author

G 

 George David Warrington (September 19, 1952 – December 24, 2007), American businessman

I 

 Ian Warrington, New Zealand Scientist

J 

 John Warrington (cricketer) (born 1948), New Zealand cricketer
 John Warrington (producer) (born 1962), British television producer
 Josh Warrington (born 14 November 1990), British boxer
 John Michael Warrington (1924-2010) was an English cricketer
 John Wesley Warrington (1844-1921), American judge

L 

 Lisa Jadwiga Valentina Warrington (born 1952), British-born Kiwi, Academic, director, author
 Lewis Wesley Warrington (born 10 October 2002), English footballer
 Lewis Warrington, (3 November 1782 – 12 October 1851), American Naval Officer and United States Secretary of the Navy
 Lewis Warrington (Medal of Honor), (unknown – January 5, 1879), United States Army Medal of Honor recipient

P 

 Percy Ewart Warrington (1889–1961) educationist and evangelical Church of England clergyman

S 

 Sara Warrington, Soap opera character

T 

 Thomas Rolls Warrington, 1st Baron Warrington of Clyffe, (29 May 1851 – 26 October 1937), Member of the Privy Council of the United Kingdom
 Tony Warrington, (born 28 March 1947), English cricketer
 Tex Warrington, (March 21, 1921 – September 21, 1993) professional American football player

W 

 William Warrington (1796-1869), British maker of stained glass windows.

Surnames